Piljužići is a village in the municipalities of Teslić (Republika Srpska) and Tešanj, Bosnia and Herzegovina.

Demographics 
According to the 2013 census, its population was 1,835, with 1,823 living in the Tešanj part and 12 living in the Teslić part.

References

Populated places in Tešanj
Populated places in Teslić